Salvatore Ferraro (born 8 September 1983) is an Italian footballer who plays as a defender for Cattolica San Marino.

Club career
Ferraro started his career at Internazionale. In 2001-2002 he was part of the Nerazzurri youth team, but made his debut against Feyenoord on 11 April 2002, playing 90 minutes in the return leg of the UEFA Cup semifinal. A few days later, he played his only Serie A game, replacing Clarence Seedorf in the clash against Chievo. In January 2003, he was graduated from Primavera Team (under-20 Team), he was loaned to Prato of Serie C1.

A.C. Milan
Ferraro (half of rights were valued at €1.75M), along with Alessandro Livi, Giuseppe Ticli (50% valued €1.75M) and Marco Varaldi (half of the rights valued €1.75M) were moved to city rival A.C. Milan, and Matteo Giordano (50% valued €1.5M), Ronny Diuk Toma  (50% valued €1.5M), Simone Brunelli and Matteo Deinite  (50% valued €1.5M) moved to Inter. Both clubs co-owned the 8 players. The deal later criticized as using player transfer to make false profit in balance sheet, it is because the transfer fees were paid via player exchange, but the transfer fees in the balance sheet could be adjusted by the two clubs.

He was immediately left on loan to Pavia of Serie C1.

In summer 2004, he was loaned to Rimini of Serie C1, and then to Vittoria, also in Serie C1.

In summer 2005, he moved to Lumezzane of Serie C1.

In summer 2006, he moved to San Marino of Serie C1.

Benevento
In summer 2007, A.C. Milan bought remaining half player's rights from Inter, for €300,000 (while Giuseppe Ticli's half for €100,000; Giordano to Inter for €50,000, Deinite for €250,000, which only €100,000 cash involved from Milan to Inter, and in 2008 deal between Varaldi and Toma solved by Inter paid Milan the same amount), and Ferraro moved to Benevento of Serie C2 on loan. In summer 2008 he terminated his remain contract with Milan in order to join Benevento in free transfer. It made Milan registered an accounting losses of €25,000.

Lanciano & Ternana
In July 2010 he was signed by Lanciano in 2-year contract. In July 2011 he was transferred to Ternana.

International career
Ferraro played in 2000 UEFA European Under-16 Football Championship qualification for the Italy national under-16 football team (now equivalent to the under-17 team). He was then capped for the U-17 team, the feeder team of U-18 team (now equivalent to the U-19 team). In mid-2001 he was promoted to the U-19 team and played few friendlies. In August 2002 he was selected to the U-20 team for a youth event in Alcúdia.

References

External links
 Inter Archive
 
 Football.it Profile 
 FIGC 

1983 births
People from Catanzaro
Footballers from Calabria
Living people
Italian footballers
Italy youth international footballers
Association football defenders
Inter Milan players
A.C. Prato players
A.C. Milan players
F.C. Pavia players
Rimini F.C. 1912 players
F.C. Vittoria players
F.C. Lumezzane V.G.Z. A.S.D. players
A.S.D. Victor San Marino players
Benevento Calcio players
S.S. Virtus Lanciano 1924 players
Ternana Calcio players
U.S. Catanzaro 1929 players
F.C. Grosseto S.S.D. players
A.C. Tuttocuoio 1957 San Miniato players
Aurora Pro Patria 1919 players
Mantova 1911 players
Forlì F.C. players
Serie A players
Serie B players
Serie C players
Serie D players
Sportspeople from the Province of Catanzaro